Nguyễn Đình Minh (born 31 March 1966) is a Vietnamese sprinter. He competed in the men's 100 metres at the 1988 Summer Olympics.

References

1966 births
Living people
Athletes (track and field) at the 1988 Summer Olympics
Vietnamese male sprinters
Olympic athletes of Vietnam
Place of birth missing (living people)